Coronene (also known as superbenzene and cyclobenzene) is a polycyclic aromatic hydrocarbon (PAH) comprising seven peri-fused benzene rings. It is a yellow material that dissolves in common solvents including benzene, toluene, and dichloromethane. Its solutions emit blue light fluorescence under UV light. It has been used as a solvent probe, similar to pyrene.

The compound is of theoretical interest to organic chemists because of its aromaticity. It can be described by 20 resonance structures or by a set of three mobile Clar sextets. In the Clar sextet case, the most stable structure for coronene has only the three isolated outer sextets as fully aromatic although superaromaticity would still be possible when these sextets are able to migrate into the next ring.

Occurrence and synthesis

Coronene occurs naturally as the very rare mineral carpathite, which is characterized by flakes of pure coronene embedded in sedimentary rock. This mineral may be created from ancient hydrothermal vent activity.  In earlier times this mineral was also called karpatite or pendletonite.

The presence of coronene putatively formed from contact of magma with fossil fuel deposits has been used to argue that the Permian-Triassic “Great Dying” event was caused by a greenhouse gas warming episode triggered by large-scale Siberian vulcanism.

Coronene is produced in the petroleum-refining process of hydrocracking, where it can dimerize to a fifteen ring PAH, trivially named "dicoronylene" (formally named benzo[10,11]phenanthro[2',3',4',5',6':4,5,6,7]chryseno[1,2,3-bc]coronene or benzo[1,2,3-bc:4,5,6-b'c']dicoronene). Centimeter-long crystals can be grown from a supersaturated solution of the molecules in toluene (ca. 2.5 mg/ml), which is slowly cooled (ca. 0.04 K/min) from 328 K to 298 K over a period of 12 hours.

Structure
Coronene is a planar circulene. It forms needle-like crystals with a monoclinic, herringbone-like structure. The most common polymorph is γ, but β form can also be produced in an applied magnetic field (ca. 1 Tesla) or by phase transition from γ decreasing the temperature below 158 K. The structure containing two C-H groups on one benzene ring, so-called DUO, was analyzed by infrared spectroscopy.

Other uses
Coronene has been used in the synthesis of graphene. For example, coronene molecules evaporated onto a copper surface at 1000 degrees Celsius will form a graphene lattice which can then be transferred onto another substrate.

See also
 Cyclooctadecanonaene, the compound consisting of just the outer ring without the benzene core
 Hexa-peri-hexabenzocoronene and hexa-cata-hexabenzocoronene, consisting of additional benzene rings fused around the periphery

References 

Polycyclic aromatic hydrocarbons